Ras Nouadhibou is a  peninsula or headland divided by the border between Mauritania and Western Sahara on the African coast of the Atlantic Ocean. It is internationally known as Cabo Blanco in Spanish or Cap Blanc in French (both meaning "White Headland").

In the 14th and 15th centuries, fishing activities carried out from the nearby Canary Islands, by Spanish fishermen, inspired Spain to develop an interest in the desert coast of what is today called Western Sahara.

Cabo Blanco, in the Atlantic Ocean, is the only place in the world where Mediterranean monk seals form a true colony.  In 1997, two-thirds of the colony died off, but there has been gradual recovery since.

Although it is not the westernmost point of Africa, due to the Earth's curvature it is significantly more northern despite a similar longitude than Cap-Vert, the actual westernmost point of the mainland continent, meaning that the peninsula actually is the westernmost solar point – the last place in Africa where the sun sets.

Geography 
The headland forms the western limit of Dakhlet Nouadhibou Bay.

This thin stretch of land is divided between Mauritania and Western Sahara.

History 
Portuguese sailing explorers first reached the location they called Cabo Branco in 1441. The Spanish interest in Western Africa, in the desert coast of the Sahara, resulted from fishing activities carried out from the Canary Islands by Spanish fishermen, who also hunted and traded seal. The Spanish fished and whaled off the Sahara coast from Dakhla to Ras Nouadhibou from 1500 to the present, ranging from whaling humpback whales and likely North Atlantic right whales and whale calves, mostly in Cape Verde, the Guinea gulf in Annobón, and the São Tomé and Príncipe islands.
These fishing activities have had a negative impact on wildlife and caused the disappearance or endangerment of many species of marine mammals and birds.

The Spanish originally claimed the land from 20° 51' N (near Cap Blanc) to 26° 8' N (near Cape Bojador) in 1885. This protectorate was governed from the Canary Islands in 1887. France would later claim the Western Sahara. At a joint convention held in 1900, the French and Spanish settled the boundary, dividing the area between Spanish Sahara and French West Africa. Today, the same border separates Western Sahara from Mauritania. However, the western side is currently policed by Mauritania, as neither Morocco nor the Polisario Front occupies the area.

A lighthouse was constructed on the cape in 1910.

Monk seals

The Mediterranean monk seal's (Monachus monachus) former range extended throughout the Northwest Atlantic Africa, Mediterranean and Black Sea,  coastlines, including all offshore islands of the Mediterranean, and into the Atlantic and its islands: Canary, Madeira, Ilhas Desertas, Porto Santo, as far west as the Azores. Vagrants could be found as far south as Gambia and the Cape Verde islands, and as far north as continental Portugal and Atlantic France. Today, the cape hosts the largest surviving single population of the species, and the only remaining site which still seems to preserve a colony structure. In the summer of 1997, two-thirds of its seal population were wiped out within two months, extremely compromising the species' viable population. While opinions on the precise causes of this epidemic remain divided (the most likely cause being a morbilivirus or, more likely, a toxic algae bloom,) the mass die-off emphasized the precarious status of a species already regarded as critically endangered throughout its range.

While still far below the early 1997 count, numbers in this all-important location have started a slow-paced recovery ever since. Currently, the population in this location is estimated at 270 individuals, down from some 310 in 1997, but still the largest single colony by far.  The threat of a similar incident that could wipe out the entire population remains.

In literature

Captain James Riley's captivity memoir, Sufferings in Africa (1815), recounts his and his men's experiences after beaching their ship at what is thought to be Cabo Blanco.

Robert Adams's Narrative recounts a similar experience.

The Pharaon from The Count of Monte Cristo sinks between here and Cape Bojador.

Cape Blanco is mentioned briefly in the novel Moby Dick.

Also referenced in Sir Arthur Conan Doyle's short story, J. Habakuk Jephson’s Statement.

References

Landforms of Mauritania
Landforms of Western Sahara
Dakhlet Nouadhibou Region
Headlands of Africa
Mauritania–Western Sahara border